Jack Villiers Leckie (born 3 May 1887 – ???) was a Scottish communist activist.

Early life
Leckie was born in Maybole, Ayrshire, Scotland, into an Irish family.  He became interested in anarchism and industrial unionism, and travelled to the United States, arriving in  New York City on 14 October 1914, where he joined the Industrial Workers of the World. He apparently became a U.S. citizen in Connecticut in 1916, and described himself as a machinist. He moved to Chicago shortly after. He returned to the UK in 1918.

In 1920, The Socialist described him as "an ardent antiparliamentarian, who breathes dynamite, and talks red armies".

Political activism

Leckie returned to Scotland and joined the Socialist Labour Party (SLP).  The SLP was central to the Clyde Defence Committee, and Leckie was elected as the committee's secretary.  With other leading figures from the committee, including John Maclean, in 1920, he founded the Communist Labour Party (CLP), and was elected as its chairman.  This was intended to be a Scottish communist party, opposed to participation in Parliament and joint work with the Labour Party.

According to Graham Stevenson, Leckie attended the 2nd World Congress of the Comintern, although he does not appear in the official list of delegates.  Either way, he was convinced of the need for communists in Great Britain to unite in a single communist party and to participate in elections, and also accepted that it would seek affiliation to the Labour Party.  As a result, he championed the merger of the CLP into the new Communist Party of Great Britain (CPGB), which was completed at a unity conference early in 1921.

Later in 1921, Leckie became interested in the Irish Republican Army (IRA) and the potential of creating a workers' army in Scotland.  He brought over a captain from the IRA and began drilling volunteers in eastern Fife, although this project was abandoned when he was called away by the CPGB to organise workers in Coventry.  There, he was centrally involved in supporting engineers during the lock-out, and became the leading figure in the Coventry Unemployed Workers' Movement, who planned to stand him in the 1922 general election.  The CPGB initially backed his candidature, and Leckie campaigned in the city, but in August, the CPGB withdrew its support in the interests of unity with the Labour Party, and Leckie stood down.

Leckie attended the 4th World Congress of the Comintern, serving as a member of the Presidium.  The Congress deputised him to investigate conditions in the Ruhr under the Franco-Belgian occupation, and then served as the CPGB's representative to the Comintern at its headquarters in Berlin.  During his time there, he was given permission to attend the central committee of the Communist Party of Germany.

In 1925, Leckie was sent back to the UK to become the British secretary of Workers International Relief, a CPGB-led organisation, with a brief to move it from a focus on funding welfare to a more combative role.  Leckie hoped to return to Germany, but the run-up to the UK general strike and the imprisonment of much of the party's leadership meant that he could not be spared.

The CPGB hoped to run Leckie as a candidate in the 1928 Linlithgowshire by-election, but eventually decided against it, due to a lack of funds.  However, he did contest Dunfermline Burghs at the 1929 general election, where he took 6.5% of the vote and was not elected.  He remained active in the CPGB for a few more years, making the news when he was arrested during a textile workers' dispute in West Yorkshire in 1930.

References

1887 births
Year of death missing
Communist Party of Great Britain members
Industrial Workers of the World members
Scottish anarchists
Scottish people of Irish descent
Socialist Labour Party (UK, 1903) members
People from Maybole
British emigrants to the United States